South Hopkinton is a small village located in the town of Hopkinton, Rhode Island. Residents of South Hopkinton use the zip code for Bradford, Rhode Island, but the village of Bradford is located only within nearby Westerly.

Geography
The center of South Hopkinton is where Ashaway Road and Diamond Hill Road meet. The village ends at the Pawcatuck River, where Hopkinton borders Westerly. Other villages nearby include Burdickville, Kierieian and Ashaway.

References

Villages in Washington County, Rhode Island
Villages in Rhode Island